David J. DeWitt (July 20, 1948) is a computer scientist specializing in database management system research at the Massachusetts Institute of Technology. Prior to moving to MIT, DeWitt was the John P. Morgridge Professor (Emeritus) of Computer Sciences at the University of Wisconsin–Madison. He was also a Technical Fellow at Microsoft, leading the Microsoft Jim Gray Systems Lab at Madison, Wisconsin. Professor DeWitt received a B.A. degree from Colgate University in 1970, and a Ph.D. from the University of Michigan in 1976. He then joined the University of Wisconsin-Madison and started the Wisconsin Database Group, which he led for more than 30 years.

Professor DeWitt is known for his research in the areas of parallel databases, benchmarking, object-oriented databases, and XML databases. 

He was elected a member of the National Academy of Engineering (1998) for the theory and construction of database systems. He is also a Fellow of the Association for Computing Machinery.

He received the ACM SIGMOD Innovations Award (now renamed SIGMOD Edgar F. Codd Innovations Award) in 1995 for his contributions to the database systems field. In 2009, ACM recognized the seminal contributions of his Gamma parallel database system project with the ACM Software System Award. Also in 2009, he received the IEEE Emanuel R. Piore Award for his contributions to the database systems field.

DeWitt Clause
Several commercial database vendors include an end-user license agreement provision, known as the DeWitt Clause, that prohibits researchers and scientists from explicitly using the names of their systems in academic papers.

In essence, a DeWitt Clause forbids the publication of database benchmarks that the database vendor has not sanctioned. The original DeWitt Clause was established by Oracle at the behest of Larry Ellison. Ellison was displeased with a benchmark study done by David DeWitt in 1982, then an assistant professor, using his Wisconsin Benchmark program, which showed that Oracle's system had poor performance.

References

External links

American computer scientists
Fellows of the Association for Computing Machinery
Year of birth missing (living people)
Living people
Microsoft technical fellows
Database researchers
Members of the United States National Academy of Engineering
University of Michigan alumni
Industry and corporate fellows